Paul-Eugène Roy (8 November 1859 – 20 February 1926) was a Canadian Roman Catholic priest, and Archbishop of Quebec.

External links
 
 Catholic-Hierarchy entry
 

1859 births
1926 deaths
Roman Catholic archbishops of Quebec
20th-century Roman Catholic archbishops in Canada
Burials at the Cathedral-Basilica of Notre-Dame de Québec